James Robert Houser, Jr. (born December 15, 1984) is an American former professional baseball pitcher, who played in Major League Baseball (MLB) for the Florida Marlins in 2010.

High school
Houser was an outstanding pitcher for Sarasota High School in Sarasota, Florida. During his senior year, he had an 11-1 record with a 1.40 ERA, striking out 118. He was named Florida's "Mr. Baseball" in 2003.

Professional career

Tampa Bay Rays
Houser was drafted in the second round of the 2003 MLB draft by the then Tampa Bay Devil Rays. He began his career for the Princeton Devil Rays of the Appalachian League. In 2005, he was the pitcher of the year for the Southwest Michigan Devil Rays, and was also named to the Midwest League All-Star Game. The following year, he was again named pitcher of the year, this time for the Visalia Oaks of the California League.

He was released by the Rays on August 1, 2009, to make room for Jeff Bennett.

Florida Marlins
Before the 2010 season, Houser inked a minor-league contract with the Florida Marlins. He joined the Triple-A New Orleans Zephyrs on May 20.  He was called up to the major league team in late June.

Baltimore Orioles
On February 1, 2011, Houser signed with the Baltimore Orioles on a minor league deal. Sat out season with season ending open heart surgery.

Independent Leagues
He played in the Atlantic League of Professional Baseball in 2012 and 2013 for the York Revolution, Camden Riversharks and Long Island Ducks.

In 2014, he signed with the Acereros de Monclova of the Mexican League.

Personal life
Houser married his wife Nicole on January 2, 2009. They have three kids together; Kellen James born on January 9, 2010, Bryce Camden on January 11, 2012, and Lily Grace born on February 13, 2015.

References

External links

1984 births
Living people
Acereros de Monclova players
American expatriate baseball players in Mexico
Baseball players from Florida
Bravos de Margarita players
American expatriate baseball players in Venezuela
Camden Riversharks players
Cangrejeros de Santurce (baseball) players
Charleston RiverDogs players
Colorado Springs Sky Sox players
Durham Bulls players
Florida Marlins players
Jacksonville Suns players
Liga de Béisbol Profesional Roberto Clemente pitchers
Long Island Ducks players
Major League Baseball pitchers
Mexican League baseball pitchers
Montgomery Biscuits players
New Orleans Zephyrs players
Princeton Devil Rays players
Sarasota High School alumni
Southwest Michigan Devil Rays players
Sportspeople from Sarasota, Florida
Visalia Oaks players
York Revolution players